Kuala Nerang is the capital of Padang Terap District, Kedah, Malaysia.

Tourist attractions
 Puncak Janing Recreational Forest - A recreational forest with a waterfall located within the Bukit Perangin Forest Reserve.

References

Padang Terap District
Populated places in Kedah